WZFJ is a radio station airing a Contemporary Christian music format licensed to Breezy Point, Minnesota, broadcasting on 104.3 MHz FM.  The station serves the areas of Brainerd, Minnesota and Aitkin, Minnesota, and is owned by Minnesota Christian Broadcasters, Inc.

History
The station began broadcasting on June 14, 1984 and originally broadcast at 95.3 MHz, holding the call sign KLKS. The station was owned by Lakes Broadcasting Group. In 1991, the station's frequency was changed to 104.3 MHz. As KLKS, the station aired an adult standards format.

In 2012, the station was purchased for $350,000 by Minnesota Christian Broadcasters, which moved the Christian contemporary programming of WZFJ "The Pulse" to the station from 100.1 MHz. The KLKS call sign moved to 100.1 MHz, which was temporarily taken silent.

References

External links

Contemporary Christian radio stations in the United States
Radio stations established in 1984
1984 establishments in Minnesota
Christian radio stations in Minnesota